Gostyczyn commune Susz

Fabianki  is a former settlement in the administrative district of Gmina Susz, within Iława County, Warmian-Masurian Voivodeship, in northern Poland.

References

Gostyczyn commune Susz, Hunting Manor

Fabianki